Mammalian Species is a peer-reviewed scientific journal published by Oxford University Press on behalf of the American Society of Mammalogists. The journal publishes accounts of 12–35 mammal species yearly. The articles summarize the current literature about each mammal and its systematics, genetics, fossil history, distribution, anatomy, physiology, behavior, ecology, and conservation is described. The journal was established in 1969. The current editor-in-chief is Meredith J. Hamilton (Oklahoma State University–Stillwater).

See also 
 Journal of Mammalogy

External links 
 Official website at Oxford University Press

Mammalogy journals
Publications established in 1969
English-language journals